Blake Aaron Tekotte (born May 24, 1987) is a former American professional baseball outfielder. He played in Major League Baseball (MLB) for the San Diego Padres and Chicago White Sox. He completed his professional career in 2016 playing for the Long Island Ducks of the Atlantic League of Professional Baseball.

Career

Amateur
Tekotte attended David H. Hickman High School in Columbia, Missouri and the University of Miami, where he played for the Miami Hurricanes baseball team. While at Miami, he reached the College World Series in 2006 and 2008. In 2007, he played collegiate summer baseball with the Brewster Whitecaps of the Cape Cod Baseball League and was named a league all-star.

San Diego Padres
He was drafted by San Diego Padres in the third Round (101st overall) of the 2008 Major League Baseball draft.

Tekotte was called up by the Padres for the first time on May 23, 2011.

Tekotte made his major league debut on May 25, 2011, one day after his 24th birthday, pinch-hitting for Mat Latos, lining out to the right fielder Jon Jay.

Chicago White Sox
On November 7, 2012, Tekotte was traded to the Chicago White Sox for minor league pitcher Brandon Kloess after being designated for assignment on November 2. On August 9, 2013, Tekotte hit his first Major League home run against Minnesota Twins pitcher Liam Hendriks. He was outrighted off the White Sox roster on December 6, 2013.

Arizona Diamondbacks
Tekotte was traded to the Arizona Diamondbacks on August 3, 2014.

Boston Red Sox
Tekotte signed a minor league contract with the Boston Red Sox on January 10, 2015.

Long Island Ducks
Tekotte signed with the Long Island Ducks of the Atlantic League of Professional Baseball on March 21, 2016.

Tekotte retired following the 2016 season, and returned to complete his degree at the University of Miami. He has joined the Miami Hurricanes baseball coaching staff for the 2017 season as a student coach.

References

External links

Miami Hurricanes bio

1987 births
Living people
Sportspeople from Columbia, Missouri
Hickman High School alumni
Baseball players from Missouri
San Diego Padres players
Chicago White Sox players
Miami Hurricanes baseball players
Eugene Emeralds players
Fort Wayne TinCaps players
Lake Elsinore Storm players
San Antonio Missions players
Tucson Padres players
Charlotte Knights players
Reno Aces players
Major League Baseball outfielders
Portland Sea Dogs players
Long Island Ducks players
Miami Hurricanes baseball coaches
Brewster Whitecaps players